The Electronic Communications Act 2000 (c.7) is an Act of the Parliament of the United Kingdom that:
Had provisions to regulate the provision of cryptographic services in the UK (ss.1-6); and
Confirms the legal status of electronic signatures (ss.7-10).

The United Kingdom government had come to the conclusion that encryption, encryption services and electronic signatures would be important to e-commerce in the UK.

By 1999, however, only the security services still hankered after key escrow. So a "sunset clause" was put in the bill. The Electronic Communications Act 2000 gave the Home Office the power to create a registration regime for encryption services. This was given a five-year period before it would automatically lapse, which eventually happened in May 2006.

References

External links
An account from the Foundation For Information Policy Research

United Kingdom Acts of Parliament 2000
Cryptography law